Sinbad Kali born 25 March 1987  is a former professional rugby league footballer. He previously played for the Central Coast Centurions in the NSW Cup and in the NRL for the Melbourne Storm. He played as a prop.

Playing career
Kali was named in the Tonga training squad for the 2008 Rugby League World Cup.

In 2010, he played for the Wyong Roos in the Newcastle Rugby League, then signed with the Newcastle Knights feeder club, the Central Coast Centurions for 2011.
He last played in the Bundaberg red cup for The Entrance Tigers on the N.S.W Central Coast.

References

External links
Melbourne Storm profile
Melbourne's faceless men
Sinbad the Storm sailor

1987 births
Living people
Australian rugby league players
Australian sportspeople of Tongan descent
Melbourne Storm players
Central Coast Centurions players
Wyong Roos players
Rugby league props
Rugby league players from Sydney